Rolf Syversen (born 18 October 1948) is a Norwegian rower. He competed in the men's coxed four event at the 1964 Summer Olympics.

References

1948 births
Living people
Norwegian male rowers
Olympic rowers of Norway
Rowers at the 1964 Summer Olympics
Place of birth missing (living people)